Michael Gerdes (born 23 May 1960) is a German politician. Born in Bottrop, North Rhine-Westphalia, he represents the SPD. Michael Gerdes has served as a member of the Bundestag from the state of North Rhine-Westphalia since 2009.

Life 
He became member of the bundestag after the 2009 German federal election. He is a member of the Committee for Labour and Social Affairs.

References

External links 

  
 Bundestag biography 

1960 births
Living people
Members of the Bundestag for North Rhine-Westphalia
Members of the Bundestag 2021–2025
Members of the Bundestag 2017–2021
Members of the Bundestag 2013–2017
Members of the Bundestag 2009–2013
Members of the Bundestag for the Social Democratic Party of Germany